The Minister for Transport was a position in the Luxembourgian cabinet.  The Minister for Transport was responsible for maintenance and revision of the road network, operation of public transport, and regulation of aviation and waterways.

On 23 July 2009, the position was merged with those of the Ministry for the Environment and Minister for Public Works to form the new position of Minister for Sustainable Development and Infrastructure, under Claude Wiseler.

List of Ministers for Transport

References
 
 Luxembourg Government website, retrieved 11 August 2009

 
Transport, Minister for